The Barbados Royals are a women's cricket team that compete in the Women's Caribbean Premier League and The 6ixty, representing Barbados. The formation of the team was announced in March 2022, aligned with the equivalent men's team, playing their first match in August 2022.

The team's first squad was announced in June 2022, with the side captained by Hayley Matthews. The side won the inaugural edition of The 6ixty.

History
On 14 March 2022, Cricket West Indies announced their intention to hold the first Women's Caribbean Premier League, to run alongside the men's tournament, which began in 2013. Barbados Royals were one of three teams announced to be taking part in the tournament, aligned with one of the men's teams. The team's squad was announced on 16 June 2022, with Hayley Matthews announced as captain of the team. The inaugural Women's Caribbean Premier League is scheduled to begin on 31 August 2022. 

On 22 June 2022, it was announced that a T10 tournament would precede the Women's CPL, taking place from 24 to 28 August, known as The 6ixty and involving the three teams competing in the main tournament. The side won the inaugural edition of The 6ixty, qualifying second in the group stage before beating Trinbago Knight Riders in the final by 15 runs. The side finished second in the initial group stage of the inaugural Women's Caribbean Premier League, before losing to Trinbago Knight Riders in the final by 10 runs.

Players

Current squad
As per 2022 season. Players in bold have international caps.

Seasons

The 6ixty

Women's Caribbean Premier League

See also
 Barbados Royals
 Barbados women's national cricket team

References

Cricket in Barbados
Women's Caribbean Premier League teams
Cricket clubs established in 2022